Sweden is set to participate in the Eurovision Song Contest 2023 in Liverpool, United Kingdom, with "Tattoo" performed by Loreen. The Swedish broadcaster  (SVT) organised  in order to select its entry for the contest.

Background 

This includes its  entry, "Hold Me Closer" performed by Cornelia Jakobs, which finished in fourth place with 438 points.

The Swedish national broadcaster,  (SVT), broadcasts the event within Sweden and organises the selection process for the nation's entry. Since 1959, SVT has organised the annual competition  in order to select the Swedish entry for the Eurovision Song Contest.

Before Eurovision

Melodifestivalen 2023 
The 2023 edition of  featured four heats, a semi-final (replacing the previously-held Second Chance round) and a final, and saw 28 acts compete. It was held between 4 February and 11 March 2023, concluding with a final held at the Friends Arena in Stockholm. After the cancellation of the traditional tour around six cities of the country (namely Malmö, Gothenburg, Linköping, Lidköping, Örnsköldsvik and Stockholm) for the previous edition due to the COVID-19 Omicron variant, SVT subsequently announced that the six cities would host the tour in 2023 instead, with new dates.

Heats and semi-final 

 The first heat took place on 4 February 2023. "Where You Are (Sávežan)" performed by Jon Henrik Fjällgren, Arc North  Adam Woods and "Rhythm of My Show" performed by Tone Sekelius qualified directly to the final, while "Diamonds" performed by Victor Crone and "" performed by Elov & Beny advanced to the semi-final. "Haunted" performed by Rejhan, "" performed by Loulou Lamotte and "" performed by Eva Rydberg & Ewa Roos were eliminated from the contest.
The second heat took place on 11 February 2023. "Never Give Up" performed by Maria Sur and "On My Way" performed by Panetoz qualified directly to the final, while "" performed by Theoz and "Now I Know" performed by Tennessee Tears advanced to the semi-final. "All My Life (Where Have You Been)" performed by Wiktoria, "" performed by Uje Brandelius and "Comfortable" performed by Eden were eliminated from the contest.
The third heat took place on 18 February 2023. "Air" performed by Marcus & Martinus and "Royals" performed by Paul Rey qualified directly to the final, while "" performed by Nordman and "For the Show" performed by Melanie Wehbe advanced to the semi-final. "" performed by Ida-Lova, "Sober" performed by Laurell and "" performed by Casanovas were eliminated from the contest.
The fourth heat took place on 25 February 2023. "Tattoo" performed by Loreen and "Six Feet Under" performed by Smash Into Pieces qualified directly to the final, while "Where Did You Go" performed by Kiana and "One Day" performed by Mariette advanced to the semi-final. "Gorgeous" performed by Axel Schylström, "" performed by Signe & Hjördis and "" performed by Emil Henrohn were eliminated from the contest.
The semi-final took place on 4 March 2023. All of the songs competed against each other in a single semi-final, with the top four songs advancing to the final, similar to the preceding heats. "" performed by Nordman, "" performed by Theoz, "Where Did You Go" performed by Kiana and "One Day" performed by Mariette qualified to the final, while "Now I Know" performed by Tennessee Tears, "Diamonds" performed by Victor Crone, "For the Show" performed by Melanie Wehbe and "" performed by Elov & Beny were eliminated from the contest.

Final 

The final took place on 11 March 2023.

At Eurovision 
According to Eurovision rules, all nations with the exceptions of the host country and the "Big Five" (France, Germany, Italy, Spain and the United Kingdom) are required to qualify from one of two semi-finals in order to compete for the final; the top ten countries from each semi-final progress to the final. The European Broadcasting Union (EBU) split up the competing countries into six different pots based on voting patterns from previous contests, with countries with favourable voting histories put into the same pot. On 31 January 2023, an allocation draw was held, which placed each country into one of the two semi-finals, and determined which half of the show they would perform in. Sweden has been placed into the first semi-final, to be held on 9 May 2023, and has been scheduled to perform in the second half of the show.

References

Countries in the Eurovision Song Contest 2023
2023
Eurovision Song Contest
Eurovision Song Contest